Alexamenus or Alexamenos may refer to:

Alexamenus of Teos, student of Socrates
Alexamenus of Aetolia (2nd century BC), general 
Alexamenos graffito (late 1st – 3rd century), an inscription in Rome possibly referencing Jesus